The 2022 Daytona 500 was the first stock car race of the 2022 NASCAR Cup Series and the 64th running of the event. The race was held on Sunday, February 20, 2022, in Daytona Beach, Florida at Daytona International Speedway, a  asphalt superspeedway. In a green-white-checker finish, rookie Austin Cindric, driving for Team Penske, led 21 of the final 45 laps and held off challenges from teammate Ryan Blaney, RFK Racing's Brad Keselowski and eventual second-place finisher Bubba Wallace of 23XI Racing to win his first career NASCAR Cup Series race. Chase Briscoe of Stewart-Haas Racing finished third. Team Penske dedicated their Daytona 500 win to legendary sportscaster Bob Jenkins after the race. Jenkins used to broadcast NASCAR Races on ESPN from 1981 to 2000.

Report

Daytona International Speedway is a race track in Daytona Beach, Florida that is one of six superspeedways, the others being Auto Club Speedway, Pocono Raceway, Indianapolis Motor Speedway, Michigan International Speedway, and Talladega Superspeedway.

Background

Daytona International Speedway is one of three superspeedways to hold NASCAR races, the other two being Indianapolis Motor Speedway and Talladega Superspeedway. The track's turns are banked at 31 degrees, while the front stretch, the location of the finish line, is banked at 18 degrees.

Due to shortage issues surrounding the new Next Gen car, it was planned that the team that won the race would retain their car for the rest of the season, with NASCAR instead scanning the winner's car and place an identical paint scheme wrap (complete with Victory Lane confetti) on a prototype that would be shown at the Daytona 500 Experience, with the tradition of the exact winner's car being displayed at the Daytona 500 Experience for a year being scheduled to continue in 2023. However, it was later announced on March 8 that Austin Cindric's exact winning car would be displayed at the Daytona 500 Experience.

This was the first Daytona 500 without 2008 winner Ryan Newman since 2001. This was the first Daytona 500 for The Money Team Racing and Team Hezeberg. This was also the first Daytona 500 since 2016 to feature Greg Biffle, and the first Daytona 500 ever to feature Jacques Villeneuve. (Villeneuve previously failed to qualify for the event in 2008.)

Entry list
 (W) denotes past 500 winner.
 (R) denotes rookie driver.
 (i) denotes driver who is ineligible for series driver points.

Practice

First practice (February 15)

Second practice (February 15)

Qualifying

Qualifying results

Bluegreen Vacations Duel

The Bluegreen Vacations Duels are a pair of NASCAR Cup Series races held in conjunction with the Daytona 500 annually in February at Daytona International Speedway. They consist of two races 60 laps and 150 miles (240 km) in length, which serve as heat races that set the lineup for the Daytona 500. The first race sets the lineup for cars that qualified in odd-numbered positions on pole qualifying day, while the second race sets the lineup for cars that qualified in even-numbered positions. The Duels set the lineup for positions 3–38, while positions 39 and 40 are filled by the two "Open" (teams without a charter) cars that set the fastest times in qualifying, but did not lock in a spot in the Duels.

Duel 1

Duel 1 results

Duel 2

Duel 2 results

Starting lineup

Practice (post–Duels)

Third practice (February 18)

Final practice (February 19)

Race
Starting in 3rd place, Brad Keselowski took the lead from Kyle Larson and Alex Bowman and led the first lap of the race. On lap 7, Keselowski began to battle for the lead with Kyle Busch with Busch leading that lap but Keselowski got out in front of Busch on lap 8. On lap 27, Busch took the lead from Keselowski but Keselowski battled with him on lap 32 which Keselowski would lead that lap before Busch took it back the next lap. During green flag pitstops on lap 39, Jacques Villeneuve, making his first Daytona 500 start, spun coming to pit road and was able to keep the car going and no caution was thrown. The first caution flew on lap 41 when Kaz Grala's right rear wheel came off and Chase Briscoe got turned by Austin Cindric. The race restarted on lap 46 with Kyle Busch remaining as the leader. On lap 52, the second caution flew when Justin Haley's right front wheel came off. The race restarted on lap 57 with Kyle Busch remaining as the leader. On lap 58, William Byron took the lead from Busch. Harrison Burton took the lead from Byron on lap 59 but Burton lost the lead to Martin Truex Jr. on lap 61. With 3 laps to go in stage 1 on lap 63, an 8 car wreck occurred on the backstretch. It started when Brad Keselowski was pushing Harrison Burton when Keselowski pushed Burton at the wrong angle turning Burton into William Byron, Kyle Busch, Denny Hamlin, Ross Chastain, Christopher Bell, and Alex Bowman. Burton's car caught air, flipped over, and landed back on all 4 of his wheels. Everyone walked away ok. Stage 1 ended under caution with Martin Truex Jr. winning the stage. Ryan Blaney led the field to the restart on lap 72. After green flag pit stops, Brad Keselowski took the lead on lap 110. On lap 125, Kyle Larson took the lead from Keselowski but Keselowski took it back from Larson on the next lap. With 2 laps to go in stage 2, Martin Truex Jr. took the lead and also won the stage edging out Joey Logano. The race restarted on lap 138 with Brad Keselowski leading the race. With 50 laps to go, the 5th caution flew for a 5 car crash on the front stretch. It started when Tyler Reddick got turned by Jacques Villeneuve collecting Martin Truex Jr., Joey Logano, and Kurt Busch. The race restarted with 41 laps to go with Austin Cindric leading the field. Cindric soon began to battle for the lead with Bubba Wallace.

Final laps
With 23 laps to go, Ricky Stenhouse Jr. took the lead from Wallace. Wallace led with 22 to go but Stenhouse took full advantage the next lap. With 10 laps to go, a 6 car crash occurred in the tri-oval. Kevin Harvick got turned by Kyle Larson in which Harvick turned left and hooked Noah Gragson sending Gragson into the outside wall. The wreck also collected Chase Elliott, Todd Gilliland, and Erik Jones. The race was red flagged for a short period of time for over 5 minutes. On the restart with 6 laps to go, Austin Cindric took the lead with help from his teammate Ryan Blaney. Out of turn 4 on the same lap, Ricky Stenhouse Jr. got turned by Brad Keselowski and collected Chris Buescher bringing out the 7th and final caution of the race. The race would set up overtime. On the restart, Cindric held onto his lead with help from Ryan Blaney. In just his 7th Cup Series start and his 2nd Daytona 500 attempt, Austin Cindric held off the pack and beat Bubba Wallace by half a car length to win his first Cup Series race of his career. Chase Briscoe, Ryan Blaney, and Aric Almirola rounded out the top 5 while Kyle Busch, Michael McDowell, David Ragan, Brad Keselowski, and Chase Elliott rounded out the top 10.

Stage Results

Stage One
Laps: 65

Stage Two
Laps: 65

Final Stage Results

Stage Three
Laps: 71

Race statistics
 Lead changes: 35 among 13 different drivers
 Cautions/Laps: 7 for 37
 Red flags: 1 for 5 minutes and 32 seconds
 Time of race: 3 hours, 31 minutes and 53 seconds
 Average speed:

Media

Television

Since 2001—with the exception of 2002, 2004 and 2006—the Daytona 500 has been carried by Fox in the United States. The booth crew consists of longtime NASCAR lap-by-lap announcer Mike Joy, Clint Bowyer, and three-time NASCAR Cup Series champion and co-owner of Stewart-Haas Racing Tony Stewart. Jamie Little, Regan Smith and Vince Welch handled pit road for the television side. 1992 and 1998 Daytona 500 winning crew chief Larry McReynolds provided insight from the Fox Sports studio in Charlotte.

Radio
The race was broadcast on radio by the Motor Racing Network who has covered the Daytona 500 since 1970—and simulcast on Sirius XM NASCAR Radio. The booth crew consists of Alex Hayden, Jeff Striegle, and 1989 Cup Series champion Rusty Wallace. Longtime turn announcer Dave Moody was the lead turn announcer, calling the race from atop the Sunoco tower outside the exit of turn 2 when the field races through turns 1 and 2. Mike Bagley works the backstretch for the race from a spotter's stand on the inside of the track & Kyle Rickey called the race when the field races through turns 3 and 4 from the Sunoco tower outside the exit of turn 4. On pit road, MRN was manned by Steve Post, Kim Coon, and Dillon Welch.

Standings after the race

Drivers' Championship standings

Manufacturers' Championship standings

Note: Only the first 16 positions are included for the driver standings.

References

2022 NASCAR Cup Series
2022 in sports in Florida
February 2022 sports events in the United States
NASCAR races at Daytona International Speedway